Pimelea cracens is a species of flowering plant in the family Thymelaeaceae and is endemic to the southwest of Western Australia. It is an erect, spindly shrub with narrowly elliptic to egg-shaped leaves and creamy green to pale yellow flowers surrounded by 6 or 8 yellowish or pale green and reddish involucral bracts.

Description
Flowering mainly occurs from July to November.

Taxonomy
Pimelea ciliata was first formally described in 1988 by Barbara Lynette Rye and the description was published in the journal Nuytsia. The specific epithet (cracens) means "graceful" or "slender".

In the same edition of Nuytsia, Rye described two subspecies of P. cracens, and the names are accepted by the Australian Plant Census:
 Pimelea cracens Rye subsp. cracens has a hairy flower tube;
 Pimelea cracens Rye subsp. glabra Rye has a more or less glabrous flower tube.

Distribution and habitat
This pimelea grows on undulating plains, winter wet areas and roadsides between the Donnelly River, Israelite Bay and Kumarl in the Esperance Plains, Jarrah Forest and Mallee bioregions of south-western Western Australia.

References

cracens
Malvales of Australia
Flora of Western Australia
Plants described in 1988
Taxa named by Barbara Lynette Rye